The 1998–99 season was Chelsea F.C.'s 85th competitive season, seventh consecutive season in the Premier League and 93rd year as a club.

Season summary
After a solid fourth-place finish coupled with European and League Cup success the previous season, Chelsea really felt that they could challenge for the title this season. Chelsea made more big name signings, including French World Cup winning defender Marcel Desailly from A.C. Milan, Spanish international full-back Albert Ferrer from Barcelona and, in a club-record £5.4 million move, Italian international striker Pierluigi Casiraghi from Lazio. Casiraghi's season and career was cut short by a knee injury, but his compatriot Gianfranco Zola had arguably the best season of his career, leading Chelsea to a serious title challenge, scoring 15 goals in all competitions and setting up many other goals for his teammates.

Ultimately, the European Super Cup, won by beating Europeans champions Real Madrid, was the only trophy that Chelsea had to show for their excellence. Their defence of the now-defunct Cup Winners' Cup ended in the semi-finals, while their title challenge was ended in early May when they just couldn't get the better of Manchester United or Arsenal. Nonetheless, a final third-place finish booked them their first ever UEFA Champions League campaign and was another triumph for their excellent young manager Gianluca Vialli, who, at 35, announced his retirement as a player to concentrate on his managerial duties.

Final league table

Results summary

Results by round

Squad

Left club during season

Reserve squad

Statistics

|}

Results

Premier League

Goalscorers

  Gianfranco Zola 13
  Gustavo Poyet 11
  Tore Andre Flo 10
  Bjarne Goldbaek 5
  Frank Leboeuf 4
  Celestine Babayaro 3
  Dan Petrescu 3
  Roberto Di Matteo 2
  Pierluigi Casiraghi 1
  Jody Morris 1
  Mikael Forssell 1
  Gianluca Vialli 1

UEFA Super Cup

Goalscorers

  Gustavo Poyet 1

UEFA Cup Winners' Cup

Goalscorers

  Tore Andre Flo 2
  Frank Leboeuf 1
  Marcel Desailly 1
  Brian Laudrup 1
  Celestine Babayaro 1
  Gianfranco Zola 1
  Dennis Wise 1
  Gianluca Vialli 1
  Bernard Lambourde 1

League Cup

Goalscorers

  Gianluca Vialli 6
  Gustavo Poyet 2
  Tore Andre Flo 1
  Frank Leboeuf 1

FA Cup

Goalscorers
  Gianluca Vialli 2
  Mikael Forssell 2
  Frank Leboeuf 1
  Dennis Wise 1
  Gianfranco Zola 1
  Roberto Di Matteo 1

References

Chelsea F.C. seasons
Chelsea